Ernst Westerlund (18 March 1893 – 13 October 1961) was a Finnish sailor who competed in the 1948 Summer Olympics and in the 1952 Summer Olympics.

References

1893 births
1961 deaths
Finnish male sailors (sport)
Olympic sailors of Finland
Sailors at the 1948 Summer Olympics – 6 Metre
Sailors at the 1952 Summer Olympics – 6 Metre
Olympic bronze medalists for Finland
Olympic medalists in sailing
Medalists at the 1952 Summer Olympics